Steve, Steven or Stephen Conway may refer to:

 Steve Conway (politician) (born 1944), State Senator from Washington State
 Steve Conway (singer) (1920–1952), British singer
 Steve Conway (writer), broadcaster and writer
 Steven Conway (boxer) (born 1977), English boxer of the 1990s and 2000s
 Stephen Conway (born 1957), bishop
 Stephen Conway (property developer) (born 1948), British property developer
 Stephen Conway (cricketer) (born 1974), English academic and cricketer